Club Balonmano Valladolid was a Spanish handball team based in Valladolid, Castilla and León.

History
Club Balonmano Valladolid was founded in the 1991 summer when acquired the ACD Michelin' seat. Michelin was founded in 1975 by the own company's employees. In the 1991 summer, Michelin suffered serious economic troubles that ended with the club's history. Later, BM Valladolid bought the Michelin's seat.

After its relegation from the 2013–14 Liga ASOBAL, BM Valladolid announced it would be dissolved. Later, the club was re-founded as Atlético Valladolid and played in División de Plata.

Season by season

23 seasons in Liga ASOBAL

Trophies
King's Cup: 2
Winners: 2004-05, 2005–06
Runners-Up: 1999-00, 2010–11
ASOBAL Cup: 1
Winners: 2002-03
Supercopa ASOBAL
Runners-Up: 2000-01
EHF Cup
Runners-Up: 1998-99
EHF Challenge Cup
Runners-Up: 1999-00
EHF Cup Winners' Cup
Winners: 2008-09
Runners-Up: 2003-04, 2005–06

Current squad 2013/14

| style="font-size: 95%;" valign="top" | Goalkeepers
01  Yeray Lamariano
16  César Pérez

| style="font-size: 95%;" valign="top" | Line players
03  Gonzalo Porras
05  Iñaki Peciña

| style="font-size: 95%;" valign="top" | Wingers
06  Miguel Lacasa
09  Ismael Juárez
10  Fernando Hernández
19  Víctor Mejías

| style="font-size: 95%;" valign="top" | Back players
07  Daniel Simón
08  David Fernández
11  Pablo Cacheda
13  Paco López
17  Guillermo Corzo
18  Alberto Camino
20  José Ávila
21  Roberto Pérez
24  Miloš Božović
34  César Merino
  Miloš Pešić

| style="font-size: 95%;" valign="top" | Technical staff
 Head coach:  Nacho González
 Assistant coach:

Stadium Information
Name: - Polideportivo Huerta del Rey
City: - Valladolid
Capacity: - 3,600
Address: - Joaquin Velasco Martin, s/n.

Notable former players
Roberto García Parrondo
Raúl González
Julio Fis
Iñaki Malumbres Aldave
Václav Lanča
László Hoffmann
József Bordás
Nenad Bilbija
Ivan Nikčević
Guillaume Joli
Håvard Tvedten
Chema Rodríguez
Žikica Milosavljević
Alen Muratović
Eric Gull 
Óscar Perales
Juan Bosco Rentero
Víctor Hugo López
Víctor Alonso
Gregor Lorger
Marko Krivokapić
Tin Tokić
Alexis Rodríguez
Juan Bosco Rentero 
Luka Ščurek
Patrick Eilert
Davor Čutura
Jorge García Vega

References

External links
 BM Valladolid Official Website

Spanish handball clubs
Sport in Valladolid
Sports teams in Castile and León
Handball clubs established in 1991
Handball clubs disestablished in 2014
1991 establishments in Spain
2014 disestablishments in Spain
Defunct handball clubs